Events from the year 1984 in South Korea.

Incumbents
President: Chun Doo-hwan
Prime Minister: Chin lee-chong (until 11 November), Shin Byung-hyun (starting 11 November)

Events

Births
 January 5
Min Young-won, actress
Yoo In-young, actress
 January 8 - Jeon Ji-ae, actress
 January 18 - Seung-Hui Cho, mass murderer (d. 2007)
 June 16 - Jeon Hee-sook, fencer
 July 16 - Yoo Hyun-ji, handball player
 August 6 - Choi Hyeon-ju, archer
 August 7 - Yun Hyon-seok, poet, writer and LGBT activist (d. 2003)
 November 15 - Huh Gak, singer
 November 20 - Ali, singer-songwriter

Deaths

June 16 - Park In-chon, businessman (b. 1901)

See also
List of South Korean films of 1984 
Years in Japan
Years in North Korea

References

 
South Korea
Years of the 20th century in South Korea
1980s in South Korea
South Korea